Meet Me in St. Louis is a 1942 novel by Sally Benson.  It is the basis for the 1944 film Meet Me in St. Louis.

Background
The stories were first written as short vignettes in a series, 5135 Kensington, which The New Yorker published from June 14, 1941 to May 23, 1942. Benson took her original eight vignettes and added four more stories for a book compilation with each chapter representing a month of a year (from 1903 to 1904). When the book was published by Random House, it was titled after the MGM film, then in the very early stages of scripting. At MGM, Benson wrote an early draft of the screenplay, but it was not used.

Other adaptations
A 1959 version was produced for television, starring Jane Powell, Jeanne Crain, Patty Duke, Walter Pidgeon, Ed Wynn, Tab Hunter and Myrna Loy. It was directed by George Schaefer from the original Brecher and Finklehoffe screenplay.
The book was adapted again for television in 1966. This was a non-musical half-hour situation comedy (including laugh track) starring Shelley Fabares, Celeste Holm, Larry Merrill, Judy Land, Reta Shaw and Morgan Brittany. It was directed by Alan D. Courtney from a script written by Sally Benson, herself. This was to be a pilot for a TV series, but no network picked it up.
A Broadway musical based on the film was produced in 1989, with additional songs.

References

1942 American novels
American novels adapted into films
Novels first published in serial form
Novels set in St. Louis
Random House books
Works originally published in The New Yorker